This article lists records held by mixed martial arts (MMA) fighters.

Fighting

Most bouts

Winning

Most wins

Longest current win streak

Longest undefeated streak 

 “No Contests” ignored. * – Active Streak ^ – Career Start

Most losses 
Most career losses

References

External links

Mixed martial arts lists
Sports records and statistics
Lists of mixed martial artists